Usotsuki (Japanese うそつき "liar") may refer to:

Music
Usotsuki (Something Else song)
Usotsuki (Aya Ueto song)
"Usotsuki", song by Blue Hearts (band) from the album Stick Out
"Usotsuki", song by Miwa (singer) from the single Otoshimono (song)
"Usotsuki", song by DoCo (band), ending of the fourth Ranma ½ OAV
"Usotsuki", song by Yorushika, ending of the anime movie A Whisker Away (2020)

See also
Usotsuki Paradox